Sarah Last (born 22 July 1994) is a former Australian rules footballer who played for the Carlton Football Club in the AFL Women's competition (AFLW) and state league side (VFLW). She was drafted by Carlton with the club's 12th selection and the 94th overall in the 2016 AFL Women's Draft. She made her debut in Round 1, 2017, in the club and the league's inaugural match at Ikon Park against . Last finished the 2017 season having played three of a possible seven matches with the side. She was delisted by Carlton at the end of the 2018 season.

References

External links

Living people
1994 births
Carlton Football Club (AFLW) players
Australian rules footballers from Victoria (Australia)
Sportswomen from Victoria (Australia)
Indigenous Australian players of Australian rules football
Victorian Women's Football League players